The 1995–96 season of the Moroccan Throne Cup was the 40th edition of the competition.

Raja Club Athletic won the cup, beating FAR de Rabat 1–0 in the final, played at the Stade Hassan II in Fès. Raja Club Athletic won the cup for the fourth time in their history.

Competition

Last 16

Quarter-finals

Semi-finals

Final 
The final took place between the two winning semi-finalists, Raja Club Athletic and FAR de Rabat, on 7 April 1996 at the stade Hassan II in Fès.

Notes and references 

1995
1995 in association football
1996 in association football
1995–96 in Moroccan football